

Japan vs Canada

Sweden vs South Africa

Japan vs Sweden

Canada vs South Africa

Japan vs South Africa

Canada vs Sweden

References

Group F
Group
Group
2012–13 in South African soccer
Group